2078 is a year in the 2070s decade

2078 may also refer to
 The year 2078 BC in the 21st century BC
2078 (Pugad Baboy story arc), Philippines comic strip story arc
2078 Nanking, a Mars-crossing asteroid
2078th Weather Reconnaissance Squadron, United States Air Force unit